Live In: Nerd Rage is Brian Posehn's debut comedy album. It also contains two original songs, including "Metal by Numbers," which was released as a single in 2006.

Track listing
Opening/I'm a Good Friend - 1:28
Dork for Thirty Years - 3:12
Married Life - Sorry Fat Dudes - 5:17
Puppy Time - 2:58
Religion's Weird - 2:05
Movie Ruiners/The Unholy Trilogy - 5:44
Monkey Birthday - 2:34
Reunion - 1:11
No Dirty Magazines - 1:29
Show a Little Neck - 1:54
Late Night TV - 2:32
The News - 1:39
Quitting Pot - 1:26
Baby/Kitty Porn - 3:18
War's Over/New Boobs - 1:32
Nerd Rage/The Mattress Story - 2:57
Yelling Stuff - 4:57
Metal by Numbers - 4:18
Titannica Interview - 2:57
Try Again, Again - 4:54

Personnel
Brian Posehn - Performer, Vocals, Producer, Mixing, Photography, Screams
Geoff Green - Producer, Mixing
Bob Odenkirk - Sketches
Jonathan Donais - Guitar
Scott Ian - Guitar
Russ Parrish - Soloist
John Tempesta - Drums
Titannica - Performer
Joey Vera - Bass 
Jennie de Shazer - Photography
Timothy Leo - Design
Joe Giron - Photography

References

2005 live albums
Brian Posehn albums
Relapse Records live albums
2000s comedy albums